Arpi may refer to:

Places
Arpi, or Argyrippa, or Argos Hippium, an ancient city of Apulia, Italy
Arpi, Armenia, formerly Arpa, a town in the Vayots Dzor Province of Armenia
Lake Arpi, lake located in the Shirak Province of Armenia

People
Arpi Gabrielyan (born 1989), Armenian broadcaster, model, singer and actress
Claude Arpi, French-born author, journalist, historian and tibetologist 
Ivar Arpi (born 1982), Swedish reporter, columnist and debater

Others
ARPI system, a system in the martial arts Arnis. See Arnis#ARPI

See also
Arbi (disambiguation)